Guerra is a Portuguese, Spanish and Italian term meaning "war". Notable people with the surname Guerra include:

People

Arts
 Aaron Guerra, American guitarist
 Adam Daniel Guerra, American drag queen also known as Venus D-Lite
 Ana Clara Guerra Marques, Angolan dancer
 Andrea Guerra (composer), Italian composer
 Aureliano Fernández-Guerra, Spanish historian, poet and playwright
 Carlos Rivera Guerra, Mexican singer
 Carolina Guerra, Colombian model and actress
 Cástulo Guerra, Argentine actor
 Castullo Guerra, Argentine actor
 César Guerra-Peixe, Brazilian violinist
 Ciro Guerra, Colombian film director, screenwriter
 Ely Guerra, Mexican singer
 Gabriel Guerra, Mexican sculptor
 Giovanni Guerra, Italian painter
 Gregório de Matos e Guerra, Brazilian poet
 Juan Luis Guerra, Dominican singer
 Marcelino Guerra, Cuban singer
 María Inés Guerra, Mexican singer
 Pedro Guerra, Spanish singer
 Pia Guerra, Canadian comic book artist
 Raquel Guerra, Portuguese singer
 Rita Guerra, Portuguese singer
 Robert Guerra, American set designer
 Rosa Guerra Argentine educator, journalist, writer
 Ruy Guerra, Portuguese-Brazilian actor and director
 Shekhar Gurera, Indian cartoonist
 Tom Guerra, American guitarist
 Tonino Guerra, Italian screenwriter and poet
 Wendy Guerra, Cuban writer
 Yalil Guerra, Cuban guitarist

Sport
 Aidan Guerra, Australian rugby footballer
 Alejandra de la Guerra, Peruvian volleyball player
 Alejandro Guerra, Venezuelan footballer
 Andrea Guerra (footballer) Italian footballer
 Ariana Guerra, American gymnast
 Ascension Guerra, Spanish archer
 Aumi Guerra, Dominican bowler
 Brent Guerra, Australian footballer
 Deolis Guerra, Venezuelan baseball player
 Elvira Guerra, Italian equestrienne
 Feliciano López Diaz-Guerra, Spanish tennis player
 Hugo Guerra, Uruguayan footballer
 Jackie Guerra (footballer), American-born Puerto Rican footballer 
 Javy Guerra, American baseball player
 Juan Carlos Rojas Guerra, Mexican footballer
 José Guerra (diver), Cuban diver
 Juan Guerra (footballer, born 1927), Bolivian footballer
 Juan Guerra (footballer, born 1991), Spanish footballer
 Juan Francisco Guerra Venezuelan footballer
 Junior Guerra, Venezuelan baseball player
 Kleber Guerra, Brazilian footballer
 Learco Guerra, Italian cyclist
 Lisandra Guerra (1987), Cuban cyclist
 Martín Alejandro Machón Guerra, Guatemalan footballer
 Mike Guerra, Cuban baseball player
 Miguel Ángel Guerra, Argentinian racer
 Miguel Ángel Cascallana Guerra, Spanish handball player
 Naomie Guerra, Trinidadian footballer
 Patricia Guerra, Spanish sailor
 Paulo Guerra, Portuguese runner
 Pedro Ramos Guerra, Cuban baseball player
 Pietro Guerra, Italian cyclist
 Rafael Sánchez Guerra, Spanish football club president
 Silvio Guerra, Ecuadorian runner
 Simone Guerra, Italian footballer
 Waldir Guerra, Salvadoran footballer

Politics
 Abel Guerra, Mexican politician
 Abílio Manuel Guerra Junqueiro, Portuguese politician
 Alberto Begné Guerra, Mexican politician
 Alfonso Guerra, Spanish politician
 Braulio Guerra, Mexican politician
 Gabriel Guerra-Mondragón, American diplomat
 José Amado Ricardo Guerra, Cuban politician
 José Gutiérrez Guerra, Bolivian President
 Juan Nicasio Guerra, Mexican politician
 Marcela Guerra, Mexican politician
 Marcela Guerra Castillo, Mexican politician
 Pablo de la Guerra, American politician
 Pedro Cevallos Guerra, Spanish diplomat
 Reynaldo Guerra Garza, American judge

Military
 Antonio Barroso y Sánchez-Guerra, Spanish general
 Donato Guerra, 19th-century Mexican general
 Eutímio Guerra, Cuban army guide
 José de Bustamante y Guerra, Spanish naval officer and explorer
 José Antonio de la Guerra y Noriega, Californian soldier and settler

Religion
 Fernando da Guerra, Portuguese ecclesiastic
 Francisco Guerra (bishop), Spanish bishop
 García Guerra, Spanish bishop
 José Servando Teresa de Mier Noriega y Guerra, priest in New Spain (now Mexico)

Other
 Humberto Guerra Allison, Peruvian doctor
 Juan Nepomuceno Guerra, Mexican cartel founder
 María José Guerra Palmero (born 1962), Spanish philosopher, writer, and feminist theorist
 Rafael Guerra Bejarano, Spanish bullfighter
 Reyes Tamez Guerra, Mexican chemist
 Vida Guerra, American model

Fictional characters
 Carmen Guerra from the television show Oz

See also 
 Guerra (disambiguation)
 Kampf (disambiguation)

Italian-language surnames
Spanish-language surnames
Portuguese-language surnames